A light-sport aircraft (LSA), or light sport aircraft, is a fairly new category of small, lightweight aircraft that are simple to fly. LSAs tend to be heavier and more sophisticated than ultralight (aka "microlight") aircraft, but LSA restrictions on weight and performance separates the category from established GA aircraft. There is no standard worldwide description of an LSA .

LSAs in different countries
The civil aviation authorities in different countries have their own particular specifications and regulations which define the LSA category.

In the United States, several distinct groups of aircraft may be flown as light-sport. Existing certificated aircraft and experimental, amateur-built aircraft that fall within the definition listed in 14CFR1.1 are acceptable, as are aircraft built to an industry consensus standard rather than FAA airworthiness requirements. The accepted consensus standard is defined by ASTM International Technical Committee F37. Aircraft built to the consensus standard may be factory-built and sold with a special airworthiness certification (S-LSA) or may be assembled from a kit under the experimental rules (E-LSA) under experimental airworthiness. A company must have produced and certified at least one S-LSA in order to be permitted to sell E-LSA kits of the same model. E-LSA kits are not subject to the normal experimental amateur built (E-AB) requirement 14 CFR 21.191 which identifies an aircraft, the "major portion of which has been fabricated and assembled by persons who undertook the construction project solely for their own education or recreation."

United States
The FAA defines a light sport aircraft as an aircraft, other than a helicopter or powered lift, that since its original certification, has continued to meet the following:

 Max. gross takeoff weight: 1,320 lbs (600 kg) or 1,430 lbs for seaplanes (650 kg)
 Max. stall speed:  CAS
 Max. speed in level flight (at sea level In the U.S. Standard Atmosphere):  CAS
 Max. seats: two
 Max. engines / motors: one (if powered)
 Propeller: fixed-pitch or ground adjustable
 Cabin: unpressurized
 Fixed-pitch, semi-rigid, teetering, two-blade rotor system, if a gyroplane.
 Landing gear: fixed (except for seaplanes and gliders)

Aircraft licensing
 Can be manufactured and sold ready-to-fly under a new special light sport aircraft certification category. Aircraft must meet industry consensus standards. Aircraft under this certification may be used for sport and recreation, flight training, and aircraft rental.
 Can be licensed experimental light sport aircraft (E-LSA) if kit- or plans-built. Aircraft under this certification may be used only for sport and recreation and flight instruction for the owner of the aircraft.
 Can be licensed experimental light sport aircraft (E-LSA) if the aircraft has previously been operated as an ultralight but does not meet the FAR Part 103 definition of an ultralight vehicle. These aircraft must have been transitioned to E-LSA category no later than January 31, 2008.
 Will have a standard FAA registration - N-number.
 Category and class includes: airplane (land/sea), gyroplane, airship, balloon, weight-shift-control ("trike", land/sea), glider, and powered parachute.
 U.S. or foreign manufacture of light sport aircraft is authorized.
 Aircraft with a standard airworthiness certificate that meet above specifications may be flown by sport pilots. However, the aircraft must remain in standard category and cannot be changed to light sport aircraft category.
 May be operated at night if the aircraft is equipped per FAR 91.205, if such operations are allowed by the aircraft's operating limitations and the pilot holds at least a private pilot certificate and a minimum of a third-class medical.

FAA certification

Several different kinds of aircraft may be certificated as LSA. Airplanes (both powered and gliders), rotorcraft (gyroplanes only, not helicopters), powered parachutes, weight-shift control aeroplanes (commonly known as trikes), and lighter-than-air craft (free balloons and airships) may all be certificated as LSA if they fall within the weight and other guidelines established by the local governing authority.

The US definition of an LSA is similar to some other countries' definition of "microlight" or "ultralight" aircraft. Except for the LSA's relatively generous MTOW of 1320 pounds, the other countries' microlight definitions are typically less restrictive, not limiting airspeed or the use of variable-pitch propellers.

By contrast, the US FAA has a separate definition of ultralight aircraft defined in Federal Aviation Regulations. Ultralight aircraft in the US do not require pilot licensing, medical certification, or aircraft registration.

Aircraft certified as light-sport aircraft exceed the limitations defined for ultralight aircraft and require that the pilot possess, at a minimum, a sport pilot certificate. Among these aircraft were found those that were specifically designed to meet the LSA requirements, as well as overweight ultralights (commonly known as "fat ultralights") that previously were operated in technical violation of 14 CFR 103.

In addition to aircraft specifically designed to meet the LSA requirements, certain certificated aircraft, such as the original Piper Cub, happen to fall within the definition of a light-sport aircraft and can be operated by individuals holding FAA sport pilot certificates. The aircraft can not be re-certificated as LSA, however: although sport pilots may operate conventionally certificated aircraft that fall within the definition of an LSA, the aircraft themselves continue to be certificated in their original categories.

Several designers and manufacturers of experimental aircraft kits have developed models that are compliant with the light-sport aircraft rules.

In June 2012 the FAA indicated that they would re-visit the LSA program after their own studies indicated that "the majority" of LSA manufacturers they had inspected failed to show that they were in compliance with the standards. The FAA announcement said that as a result the "original policy of reliance on manufacturers' Statements of Compliance" ... "should be reconsidered." AOPA points out that this is a normal development of a maturing standard and does not expect any significant changes in the rules, only more scrutiny by FAA to assure compliance.

FAA certified models

Aircraft that met light-sport requirements when the rules were announced appear in FAA's list
Some additional models of S-LSA, E-LSA and E-AB aircraft that meet light-sport requirements are listed here.

Europe
In June 2011, the European Aviation Safety Agency published CS-LSA "Certification Specifications for Light Sport Aeroplanes". This introduced a new category of manufactured sport aeroplanes similar to the light-sport category found in the USA and elsewhere.

Australia
A new certification category for 'Light Sport Aircraft' came into effect on 7 January 2006. This category does not replace the previous categories, but created a new category with the following characteristics:

 A maximum stalling speed in the landing configuration (Vso) of  CAS.
 Maximum of two occupants, including the pilot.
 A fixed landing gear. A glider may have retractable landing gear. (For an aircraft intended for operation on water, a fixed or repositionable landing gear)
 A single, non-turbine engine fitted with a propeller.
 A non-pressurised cabin.
 If the aircraft is a glider, a maximum never exceed speed (Vne) of  CAS

Light-sport aircraft can be factory-manufactured aircraft or kits for amateur-building.

Japan
On 26 December 2022, Japan Civil Aviation Bureau amended the Circular of Aircraft Safety No.1-006 and clarified its own stance on LSA. The significant difference between Japan and other countries described above is that LSA in Japan is defined as a type of Experimental aircraft, i.e., non-certified aircraft, similar to amateur-built aircraft but rather than practical aircraft, i.e., certified aircraft. Permission for Test Flights etc. by Minister of Land, Infrastructure, Transport and Tourism is necessary to operate LSA in Japan as well as other non-certified aircraft. In order to operate the LSA in Japan, the aircraft, like other non-certified aircraft, requires permission for test flights, etc. from the Minister of Land, Infrastructure, Transport and Tourism. Because the LSA flight is nominally a test flight of an unknown experimental aircraft, the pilot may not have a license and the flight range is basically restricted to within 3 km of the takeoff/landing point avoiding residential areas. If the pilot of the LSA intends to fly outside of the above range or to land outside of the takeoff point, the pilot must have a Private Pilot license or a higher license and an effective aviation medical certificate. The required characteristics of LSA in Japan are modeled after those of S-LSAs in the United States. On the other hand, the E-LSA classification has not been introduced, so kit-built and plan-built LSAs are regarded as amateur-built aircraft. Imported LSA certified as CS-LSA is considered LSA on an exceptional basis, even if it does not meet the characteristics of LSA in Japan.

Maximum gross takeoff weight: 1,320 lbs or 1,430 lbs for seaplanes
Maximum speed in level flight: 120 kn CAS
Maximum stall speed: 45 kn CAS
Maximum seats: two
Maximum engines: one (reciprocating engine only)
Propeller: fixed-pitch or ground adjustable
Cabin: unpressurized
Landing gear: fixed (except for seaplanes)
Other requirements： Designed, manufactured, and quality assured by manufacturer and complied to ASTM standards of LSA.

See also
 Canadian advanced ultralight aircraft
 List of ultralight helicopters

References

 
 
 
 
 

 
United States sport aircraft